Events in the year 1184 in Norway.

Incumbents
 Monarchs – Magnus V Erlingsson , Sverre Sigurdsson

Events
 15 June - Battle of Fimreite.

Arts and literature

Births

Deaths
15 June – Magnus V of Norway – King of Norway from 1161 to 1184 (born 1156).

References

Norway